Terminalia reitzii is a species of plant in the Combretaceae family. It is endemic to Brazil.  It is threatened by habitat loss.

References

Endemic flora of Brazil
reitzii
Vulnerable plants
Taxonomy articles created by Polbot